High Water or Highwater may refer to:

 High water, the state of tide when the water rises to its highest level.

Film and television
 Highwater (film), a 2008 documentary
 Step Up: High Water, a web television series
 High Water (TV series), A Polish-language TV series broadcast by Netflix.

Music
 High Water (The Fabulous Thunderbirds album), 1997
 High Water (El-P album), 2004
 High Water I (2018) and High Water II (2019), albums by The Magpie Salute
 "High Water", a song by Uncle Tupelo from the 1993 album Anodyne
 "High Water", a song by Rush from the 1987 album Hold Your Fire
 "High Water (For Charley Patton)", a 2001 song by Bob Dylan

Places
 Highwater, Quebec, Canada
 Highwater Creek, a stream in Minnesota, U.S.
 Highwater Township, Cottonwood County, Minnesota, U.S.

Other uses
 High Water Recording Company, a blues record label
 Highwater Books, an American comic book publisher
 Jamake Highwater (Jackie Marks, 1931–2001), an American writer and journalist 
 Project Highwater, a 1962 NASA space experiment
 Capri pants, or highwaters, shorter trousers

See also
 
 
 High water mark (disambiguation)
 Hell or High Water (disambiguation)